Bistek (loan word from Spanish: bistec, "beefsteak"), also known as bistek tagalog or karne frita, is a Filipino dish consisting of thinly-sliced beefsteak braised in soy sauce, calamansi juice, garlic, ground black pepper, and onions cut into rings. It is a common staple in the Tagalog and Western Visayan regions of the Philippines. It is eaten over white rice.

Description
Bistek tagalog is made of strips of beef sirloin or tenderloin, usually flattened with a meat tenderizing tool, it is marinated then braised in soy sauce, calamansi juice (or some other citrus fruit like lime or lemon), smashed whole garlic cloves, ground black pepper, bay leaves, caramelized red onion rings, and (optionally) muscovado or brown sugar. In some recipes, fresh white onion rings are used instead to preserve its crunchiness.

In the Western Visayas, bistek tagalog is known as karne frita (also spelled carne frita, literally "fried meat" in Spanish), not to be confused with the breaded cutlet (milanesa), which is also called carne frita in the Philippines. It is cooked identically to the Tagalog version, but differs in that it is always cooked with sugar.

Variations
A modern version of bistek is bistek na baboy ("pork bistek"; bistig babi in Kapampangan), in which pork—pork chops or pork belly slices—is used instead of beef. Other modern versions can also use slices of chicken or filleted fish.

Vegan versions can also substitute beef with tofu.

Similar dishes
Bistec encebollado is a  dish found throughout Spain and Latin America, which is the predecessor to bistek. It differs from bistek tagalog in that it does not use soy sauce or citrus juices, but uses vinegar and various local herbs and ingredients instead. Related dishes include the bistec de Palomilla of Cuba, bistec a caballo of Colombia, and the bistec ranchero of Mexico.

In the Marianas Islands, Bistek is prepared similarly to Filipino Bistek, but is often made with vinegar instead of citrus juice. Achiote is also added and is typically served with peas.

See also
Philippine adobo
 List of Philippine dishes

References

Beef dishes
Philippine beef dishes
Tagalog words and phrases
Guamanian cuisine